Nautical Club of Chios (Greek: Ναυτικός Όμιλος Χίου) is an aquatic club based in Chios. It was founded in 1930. Chios plays almost constantly in A1 Ethniki (first division of Greek Water Polo championship) and it has won a Greek Cup. One time also it was the runner-up of the championship.

History  
NC Chios was founded by prominent residents of Chios in 1930. At first was a club for vessel owners. Nevertheless in 1932 evolved to a sport club. The first natatorium was near the port of Chios. During 40s decade the club declined due to World War. The club's premises were used by German army as fort. During 50s it started the reorganisation of the club. At the beginning of 60s the club faced problems but a new administration helped the club to surpass them. Since 1966, Water Polo team plays constantly in A1 Ethniki (first division). It has won a Cup and has finished in the first places of the championship many times.

Recent seasons

Honours
Greek Championship
Runners-up (1): 1997
Greek Water Polo Cup
Winner (1): 1990
Runners-up (1): 2012

References

External links
Official Website

Water polo clubs in Greece